Shadow is a children's picture book created by Marcia Brown and published by Scribner in 1982. The text is Brown's translation of the poem La Féticheuse by French writer Blaise Cendrars. 

Brown won the annual  Caldecott Medal for illustration of an American children's picture book in 1983, her third. The book was also a finalist for the National Book Award for Young People's Literature in the hardcover picture book category.

References

1982 children's books
1982 poetry books
American picture books
American poetry books
Children's poetry books
Caldecott Medal–winning works
Charles Scribner's Sons books